Irving Jahir Gudiño López (born 15 November 2000) is a Panamanian footballer who plays for Spanish club Marbella FC, on loan from Tauro F.C., as a winger.

Career

In 2020, Gudiño signed for Marbella in the Spanish third division despite interest from Spanish La Liga side Granada CF.

References

External links
Irving Gudiño at Soccerway

2000 births
Living people
Sportspeople from Panama City
Panamanian footballers
Association football wingers
Association football midfielders
Liga Panameña de Fútbol players
Tauro F.C. players
Segunda División B players
Marbella FC players
Panamanian expatriate footballers
Panamanian expatriate sportspeople in Spain
Expatriate footballers in Spain
Panama international footballers